A Sociedad Financiera de Objeto Múltiple (also known as Sofom) is a form of enterprise under Mexican law. A Sofom's main objective is to provide loans and credit. They can either be regulated entities (ER) or non-regulated entities (ENR).

Law of Mexico

The Multiple Purpose Financial Society (Sofom) is a type of company contemplated in Mexican legislation whose main objective is the granting of credit. They can be regulated (ER) or unregulated (ENR) entities. There are also Limited Purpose Financial Companies (Sofol).

Some conditions that must be met are:
 In the case of these companies, if they are regulated, they must add to their corporate name the expression "multiple purpose financial company" or its acronym "SOFOM", followed by the words "regulated entity" or its abbreviation "ER", in the case of Unregulated companies must add the expression "multiple purpose financial company" or its acronym "SOFOM", followed by the words "non-regulated entity" or its abbreviation "ENR"
 Regulated multiple-purpose financial companies must be subject to the supervision of the National Banking and Securities Commission, the unregulated ones are only subject to the supervision of the National Banking and Securities Commission for issues related to the prevention of money laundering.
 Unregulated multiple-purpose financial companies comply as of December 18, 2011 with article 115 of the Credit Institutions Law in relation to article 87-D of the General Law of Credit Auxiliary Organizations and Activities and 95 -Bis of this last ordinance, this provision was published on March 17, 2011 in the Official Gazette of the Federation, which establishes the Mandatory Actions that Auxiliary Credit Organizations must implement in the area of Laundering Prevention. of Money and Financing of Terrorism.